Freja Cohrt Kyndbøl (born 20 January 1994) is a Danish handball player for Odense Håndbold and the Danish national team.

She represented Denmark at the 2019 World Women's Handball Championship in Japan.

References

External links

Danish female handball players
1994 births
Living people   
Sportspeople from Odense
FCM Håndbold players